Suretone Records is an American record label established in 2006 as a joint venture by Jordan Schur, former CEO of Geffen Records, and Interscope Records, to release alternative rock music. Several high-profile bands such as Weezer, The Cure, Rooney, New Found Glory and Angels and Airwaves remained on Geffen and carried the Suretone imprint. 

The label shut down in 2010 after the failures of albums by Chris Cornell and Shwayze. In 2016, the Suretone label returned with distribution through the Alternative Distribution Alliance.

Current
 Limp Bizkit
 Ded
 Shwayze
 Santana

References

American record labels
Record labels established in 2006
Universal Music Group